Kitui East Constituency, formerly Mutito Constituency is an electoral constituency in Kenya. It is one of eight constituencies in Kitui County. The constituency was established for the 1988 elections. The constituency has seven wards, all electing Members of County Assembly for the Kitui County Assembly.

Members of Parliament

Locations and wards 

Universities in Kitui County

Welcome to the South Eastern Kenya University (SEKU). The University is a fully fledged University located at Kwa vonza Kitui County

References 

Kitui County
Constituencies in Eastern Province (Kenya)
1988 establishments in Kenya
Constituencies established in 1988